Da Real Choppa is the third studio album by rapper Choppa. It was released on September 13, 2005 through Roy Jones Jr.'s Body Head Entertainment. The album featured guest appearances by his fellow Body Head Bangerz and three members of the Hot Boys.

Track listing

External links 
 Body Head Entertainment Official website
 Old official website

2005 albums
Choppa albums